Microvenular hemangioma  is an acquired benign vascular tumor that presents as an asymptomatic, slowly growing, 0.5- to 2.0 cm reddish lesion on the forearms or other sites of young to middle-aged adults.

See also 
 List of cutaneous conditions

References

External links 

Dermal and subcutaneous growths